Hynhamia is a genus of moths belonging to the family Tortricidae.

Species
Hynhamia albicorpus Razowski & Becker, 2011
Hynhamia bahiana Razowski & Becker, 2011
Hynhamia brunana Brown, 1990 
Hynhamia cerina (Razowski & Becker, 1999)
Hynhamia conceptionana Razowski & Pelz, 2007
Hynhamia cornutia Brown, 1990 
Hynhamia decora Razowski & Pelz, 2007
Hynhamia diversa Razowski & Becker, 2011
Hynhamia hemileuca Meyrick, 1932 
Hynhamia lasgralariae Razowski & Pelz, 2007
Hynhamia microsocia Razowski, 1999 
Hynhamia micruncus Razowski & Pelz, 2007
Hynhamia nigropunctana Razowski & Pelz, 2007
Hynhamia obscurana Razowski & Pelz, 2007
Hynhamia ochroleuca Razowski & Brown, 2004
Hynhamia patatea Razowski & Becker, 2011
Hynhamia perampla Razowski & Becker, 1999
Hynhamia runtuana Razowski & Wojtusiak, 2009
Hynhamia sciodryas (Meyrick, 1926)

References

 , 2005, World Catalogue of Insects 5
 , 1987, Bull. Acad. Pol. Sci.,Sér. Sci. Biol. 35: 69.
 
 , 2009: Tortricidae (Lepidoptera) from the mountains of Ecuador and remarks on their geographical distribution. Part IV. Eastern Cordillera. Acta Zoologica Cracoviensia 51B (1–2): 119–187. doi:10.3409/azc.52b_1-2.119–187. Full article:  .
 , 2011: New species of Hynhamia Razowski and other genera close to Toreulia Razowski & Becker (Lepidoptera: Tortricidae). Polish Journal of Entomology 80 (1): 53–82. Full article: .

External links

tortricidae.com

 
Euliini
Tortricidae genera
Taxa named by Józef Razowski